Monastyrshchina is a rural locality (a selo) and the administrative center of Monastyrshchinskoye Rural Settlement, Bogucharsky District, Voronezh Oblast, Russia. The population was 1,156 as of 2010. There are 11 streets.

Geography 
Monastyrshchina is located on the right bank of the Don River, 36 km southeast of Boguchar (the district's administrative centre) by road. Sukhoy Donets is the nearest rural locality.

References 

Rural localities in Bogucharsky District